Eugene Wu may refer to 
 Eugene Wu (Chinese: 吳東進; pinyin: Wú Dōngjìn; born 1945), Taiwan businessman and entrepreneur
 Eugene Wen-chin Wu (Chinese: 吳文津; 1922–2022), China-born American scholar, director of the Harvard-Yenching Library
 Gene Wu, (Chinese: 吳元之; pinyin: Wú Yuánzhīl, born 1978), Chinese-American politician and attorney
 Eugene Wu, a character in the comic strip FoxTrot
 Eugene Y. Wu, a former colleague of research professor Lorena S. Beese